James Lowell may refer to:
James Arnold Lowell (1869–1933), United States federal judge
James Russell Lowell (1819–1891), American poet and diplomat
James A. Lowell (1849–1900), Canadian Member of Parliament
James Lowell (soccer) (born 2002), American soccer player
James Lowell (politician) (1867–1914), Canadian politician in the Legislative Assembly of New Brunswick
James Lowell (As the World Turns), fictional character